If the Sun Never Returns is a Franco-Swiss film directed by Claude Goretta, with a script written by the director, from the original novel by Charles Ferdinand Ramuz and stars Charles Vanel, Catherine Mouchet and Philippe Léotard. It was one of the  In-Competition Films at the 1987 Venice Film Festival. The film was selected as the Swiss entry for the Best Foreign Language Film at the 60th Academy Awards, but was not accepted as a nominee.

Plot
In a little village, lost at the bottom of a valley in the midst of mountains and deprived of sun for long months, an old man Anzerul (Charles Vanel), prophet and magician, announces the end of the world. According to his calculations the sun will not return to the village and the village  will descend into an endless winter. The villagers give way, one after the other, to panic, piling up wood or giving themselves up to drink. Only Isabelle Antide (Catherine Mouchet), holds up against the hysteria. She urges them not to give in to terror, and to struggle against a damaging fatalism. On the 13 April, the day the sun returns to the village each year, she leads them above the cover of fog which hangs over their valley.

Cast
Charles Vanel  as  Anzerul
Catherine Mouchet  as  Isabelle Antide
Philippe Léotard  as Arlettaz
Raoul Billeray   as Denis Revaz
Claude Evrard  as Follonier
Fred Ulysse  as Tissières
Jacques Mathou  as  Cyprien Métrailler

See also
 List of submissions to the 60th Academy Awards for Best Foreign Language Film
 List of Swiss submissions for the Academy Award for Best Foreign Language Film

References

External links
 
Claude Goretta at the  Film Directory

1987 films
Films based on Swiss novels
French drama films
1980s French-language films
Swiss drama films
Films set in the Alps
1980s French films